The 1935–36 Egypt Cup was the 15th edition of the Egypt Cup.

The final was held on 10 April 1936. The match was contested by Al Ittihad Alexandria and El Sekka El Hadid, with Al Ittihad winning 3–1.

Quarter-finals 

|}

Semi-finals 

|}

Final

References 

 

3
Egypt Cup
1935–36 in Egyptian football